Nicholas Clerk may refer to:

Nicholas Clerk (fl. 1407), English politician, MP for Exeter
 Nicholas T. Clerk (1930–2012), Ghanaian academic, administrator and Presbyterian minister
 Nicholas Timothy Clerk (1862–1961), Basel-trained theologian and missionary on the Gold Coast